Güneşe Giden Yol is a 1965 Turkish drama film, directed by Halit Refiğ and starring Ayhan Isik, Selda Alkor, Muzaffer Tema.

References

External links
Güneşe Giden Yol at the Internet Movie Database

1965 films
Turkish black-and-white films
Turkish drama films
1965 drama films
Films directed by Halit Refiğ